Body of War: Songs That Inspired an Iraq War Veteran is an album produced for the documentary film Body of War,  directed by Ellen Spiro and Phil Donahue.  Curated by Iraq war veteran Tomas Young, it was released by Sire Records on March 18, 2008, two days before the fifth anniversary of the United States' invasion of Iraq. Body of War was produced by Michele Anthony, Eddie Vedder, Ellen Spiro, Nicole Vanderberg, Michael Goldstone, Holly Adams and Kelly Curtis.

Young personally selected each of the tracks that appear on the album, including Eddie Vedder's previously unreleased, live version of "No More", which was written specifically for the Body of War documentary. It was performed with Ben Harper at Lollapalooza 2007 in Chicago's Grant Park. The double-CD set also features incisive songs from John Lennon, Bruce Springsteen, Bright Eyes, Neil Young, Lupe Fiasco, Serj Tankian and Kimya Dawson.

This music, Young says, serves as his personal "soundtrack for Iraq". "The compilation record was an idea that grew out of my love of music and my reliance on it before, during, and after the war", he says. "The songs I selected for the record were tracks that inspired, motivated, and at times, literally saved me over the past few years".

All proceeds from Body of War, which features original cover art designed and donated by acclaimed political artist Shepard Fairey, go to benefit the non-profit organization Iraq Veterans Against the War (IVAW), as chosen by Young. Founded in 2004 by Iraq war veterans, IVAW's goal is to give voice to the large number of active-duty service people and veterans who are against the war, but are under various pressures to remain silent. In September, Sire Records donated $100,000 to IVAW in the name of Young, who is a spokesperson for the organization.

Track listing
Disc one
"Hero's Song" - Brendan James
"American Terrorist" - Lupe Fiasco
"Light Up Ya Lighter" - Michael Franti & Spearhead
"Guerrilla Radio" - Rage Against the Machine
"Son of a Bush" - Public Enemy
"Empty Walls" - Serj Tankian
"Let Them Eat War" - Bad Religion
"White People For Peace" - Against Me!
"Letter From Iraq" - Bouncing Souls
"War" - Dilated Peoples
"Overcome (The Recapitulation)" - RX Bandits
"Fields of Agony" - No Use for a Name
"Bushonomics" - Talib Kweli & Cornel West
"The 4th Branch" - Immortal Technique
"B.Y.O.B." - System of a Down
"No More" (Live) - Eddie Vedder & Ben Harper

Disc two
"Devils & Dust" - Bruce Springsteen
"Masters of War" (Live) - Pearl Jam
"When the President Talks to God" - Bright Eyes
"Gimme Some Truth" - John Lennon
"The Restless Consumer" - Neil Young
"Battle Hymns" - The Nightwatchman
"Anthrax" - Kimya Dawson
"WMD" - Blow Up Hollywood
"State of the Union" - David Ford
"Yo George" - Tori Amos
"Love Vigilantes" - Laura Cantrell
"Black Rain - Ben Harper
"To Kill the Child" - Roger Waters
"Day After Tomorrow" - Tom Waits

External links
Official site
Body of War music site
Official trailer at YouTube
Eddie Vedder discusses the original song "No More" that he wrote for the documentary Body of War at YouTube
Donahue and Spiro talk about Young's album Body of War at YouTube
Paralyzed Iraq veteran transforms pain into protest music
Body of War at the Internet Movie Database 
Body of War at Rotten Tomatoes 
Body of War at Metacritic
Body of War at Box Office Mojo 
Body of War at Allmovie

Opposition to the Iraq War
2007 soundtrack albums
Documentary film soundtracks